WXAF (90.9 FM) is a religious-formatted radio station serving the Charleston, West Virginia metropolitan area. The station has an effective radiated power of 800 watts.  The station is simulcasting the programming of WJJJ of Beckley, West Virginia, which consists of Christian music. According to FCC filings, Shofar Broadcasting acquired the station from Maranatha Broadcasting in November 2008.

External links

XAF
XAF
2014 establishments in West Virginia
Radio stations established in 2014